Kamalpur Cheema is a village of Faisalabad in the Punjab province of Pakistan, situated  from the Nankana - Shahkot road. The town is mainly populated by the Two Big Cast in this villages Cheema clan of the Jutt people Hunjra Clan Of The Jutt People but small pockets of Cast Lohar, Mistri, Tarkhan, Mochi, Maachi, Chembay, and Christian communities.

References

Villages in Faisalabad District